Terra Nova is a municipality in the Brazilian state of Pernambuco. 578.5 km from the state's capital, Recife, it is located in the semi-arid Sertão. The estimated population in 2020, according to the Brazilian Institute of Geography and Statistics (IBGE) was 10,206 inhabitants and the total area is 318.71 km2. The municipality was created in 1958 by state law.

Its current mayor is Aline Freire of Avante, elected in 2020.

Geography

 State - Pernambuco
 Region - São Francisco Pernambucano
 Boundaries - Serrita (North); Cabrobó (South); Salgueiro (East); Parnamirim  (West)
 Area - 318.71 km2
 Elevation - 363 m
 Drainage Basin - Terra Nova River 
Vegetation - Caatinga (xeric shrubland)
 Climate - Semi arid (Sertão) Köppen: BSh
 Annual average temperature - 26.0 °C
 Distance to Recife - 578.5 km

Economy

The main economic activities in are agribusiness, especially the raising of goats, sheep, cattle, pigs, chickens and plantations of onions, tomatoes and rice.

Economic Indicators

Economy by Sector (as of 2013)

Health Indicators

References

External links 

 Official site of the Prefeitura (mayor and city hall)
 Official site of the Câmara Municipal (city council)

Municipalities in Pernambuco